Rocky Sandners Volo Nyikeine (born 26 May 1992) is a New Caledonian international footballer for who plays as goalkeeper for Hienghène Sport and the New Caledonia national team. He played in the 2012 OFC Nations Cup.

Awards

Individual
2012 OFC Nations Cup (Golden Glove)

 OFC Champions League (Golden Glove) : 2019

Team
2012 OFC Nations Cup (runners-up).

Club
 OFC Champions League: 2019

References

1992 births
Living people
New Caledonian footballers
New Caledonia international footballers
Association football goalkeepers
Gaïtcha FCN players
Hienghène Sport players
2012 OFC Nations Cup players